Artificial neural networks (ANNs), usually simply called neural networks (NNs) or neural nets, are computing systems inspired by the biological neural networks that constitute animal brains.

An ANN is based on a collection of connected units or nodes called artificial neurons, which loosely model the neurons in a biological brain. Each connection, like the synapses in a biological brain, can transmit a signal to other neurons. An artificial neuron receives signals then processes them and can signal neurons connected to it. The "signal" at a connection is a real number, and the output of each neuron is computed by some non-linear function of the sum of its inputs. The connections are called edges. Neurons and edges typically have a weight that adjusts as learning proceeds. The weight increases or decreases the strength of the signal at a connection. Neurons may have a threshold such that a signal is sent only if the aggregate signal crosses that threshold.

Typically, neurons are aggregated into layers. Different layers may perform different transformations on their inputs. Signals travel from the first layer (the input layer), to the last layer (the output layer), possibly after traversing the layers multiple times.

Training 
Neural networks learn (or are trained) by processing examples, each of which contains a known "input" and "result," forming probability-weighted associations between the two, which are stored within the data structure of the net itself. The training of a neural network from a given example is usually conducted by determining the difference between the processed output of the network (often a prediction) and a target output. This difference is the error. The network then adjusts its weighted associations according to a learning rule and using this error value. Successive adjustments will cause the neural network to produce output that is increasingly similar to the target output. After a sufficient number of these adjustments, the training can be terminated based on certain criteria. This is a form of supervised learning.

Such systems "learn" to perform tasks by considering examples, generally without being programmed with task-specific rules. For example, in image recognition, they might learn to identify images that contain cats by analyzing example images that have been manually labeled as "cat" or "no cat" and using the results to identify cats in other images. They do this without any prior knowledge of cats, for example, that they have fur, tails, whiskers, and cat-like faces. Instead, they automatically generate identifying characteristics from the examples that they process.

History

Warren McCulloch and Walter Pitts (1943) opened the subject by creating a computational model for neural networks. In the late 1940s, D. O. Hebb created a learning hypothesis based on the mechanism of neural plasticity that became known as Hebbian learning. Farley and Wesley A. Clark (1954) first used computational machines, then called "calculators", to simulate a Hebbian network. In 1958, psychologist Frank Rosenblatt invented the perceptron, the first artificial neural network, funded by the United States Office of Naval Research. The first functional networks with many layers were published by Ivakhnenko and Lapa in 1965, as the Group Method of Data Handling. The basics of continuous backpropagation were derived in the context of control theory by Kelley in 1960 and by Bryson in 1961, using principles of dynamic programming. Thereafter research stagnated following Minsky and Papert (1969), who discovered that basic perceptrons were incapable of processing the exclusive-or circuit and that computers lacked sufficient power to process useful neural networks.

In 1970, Seppo Linnainmaa published the general method for automatic differentiation (AD) of discrete connected networks of nested differentiable functions. In 1973, Dreyfus used backpropagation to adapt parameters of controllers in proportion to error gradients. Werbos's (1975) backpropagation algorithm enabled practical training of multi-layer networks. In 1982, he applied Linnainmaa's AD method to neural networks in the way that became widely used.

The development of metal–oxide–semiconductor (MOS) very-large-scale integration (VLSI), in the form of complementary MOS (CMOS) technology, enabled increasing MOS transistor counts in digital electronics. This provided more processing power for the development of practical artificial neural networks in the 1980s.

In 1986 Rumelhart, Hinton and Williams showed that backpropagation learned interesting internal representations of words as feature vectors when trained to predict the next word in a sequence.<ref name="RUMEL1986">David E. Rumelhart, Geoffrey E. Hinton & Ronald J. Williams , "Learning representations by back-propagating errors  ," Nature', 323, pages 533–536 1986.</ref>

From 1988 onward,Bohr, Henrik, Jakob Bohr, Søren Brunak, Rodney MJ Cotterill, Benny Lautrup, Leif Nørskov, Ole H. Olsen, and Steffen B. Petersen. "Protein secondary structure and homology by neural networks The α-helices in rhodopsin." FEBS letters 241, (1988): 223-228 the use of neural networks transformed the field of protein structure prediction, in particular when the first cascading networks were trained on profiles (matrices) produced by multiple sequence alignments.

In 1992, max-pooling was introduced to help with least-shift invariance and tolerance to deformation to aid 3D object recognition.J. Weng, N. Ahuja and T. S. Huang, "Learning recognition and segmentation of 3-D objects from 2-D images ," Proc. 4th International Conf. Computer Vision, Berlin, Germany, pp. 121–128, May 1993. Schmidhuber adopted a multi-level hierarchy of networks (1992) pre-trained one level at a time by unsupervised learning and fine-tuned by backpropagation.

Neural networks' early successes included predicting the stock market and in 1995 a (mostly) self-driving car.

Geoffrey Hinton et al. (2006) proposed learning a high-level representation using successive layers of binary or real-valued latent variables with a restricted Boltzmann machine to model each layer. In 2012, Ng and Dean created a network that learned to recognize higher-level concepts, such as cats, only from watching unlabeled images. Unsupervised pre-training and increased computing power from GPUs and distributed computing allowed the use of larger networks, particularly in image and visual recognition problems, which became known as "deep learning".

Ciresan and colleagues (2010) showed that despite the vanishing gradient problem, GPUs make backpropagation feasible for many-layered feedforward neural networks. Between 2009 and 2012, ANNs began winning prizes in image recognition contests, approaching human level performance on various tasks, initially in pattern recognition and handwriting recognition. For example, the bi-directional and multi-dimensional long short-term memory (LSTM) of Graves et al. won three competitions in connected handwriting recognition in 2009 without any prior knowledge about the three languages to be learned.

Ciresan and colleagues built the first pattern recognizers to achieve human-competitive/superhuman performance on benchmarks such as traffic sign recognition (IJCNN 2012).

Models

ANNs began as an attempt to exploit the architecture of the human brain to perform tasks that conventional algorithms had little success with. They soon reoriented towards improving empirical results, mostly abandoning attempts to remain true to their biological precursors. Neurons are connected to each other in various patterns, to allow the output of some neurons to become the input of others. The network forms a directed, weighted graph.

An artificial neural network consists of a collection of simulated neurons. Each neuron is a node which is connected to other nodes via links that correspond to biological axon-synapse-dendrite connections. Each link has a weight, which determines the strength of one node's influence on another.

Artificial neurons 
ANNs are composed of artificial neurons which are conceptually derived from biological neurons. Each artificial neuron has inputs and produces a single output which can be sent to multiple other neurons. The inputs can be the feature values of a sample of external data, such as images or documents, or they can be the outputs of other neurons. The outputs of the final output neurons of the neural net accomplish the task, such as recognizing an object in an image.

To find the output of the neuron we take the weighted sum of all the inputs, weighted by the weights of the connections from the inputs to the neuron. We add a bias term to this sum. This weighted sum is sometimes called the activation. This weighted sum is then passed through a (usually nonlinear) activation function to produce the output. The initial inputs are external data, such as images and documents. The ultimate outputs accomplish the task, such as recognizing an object in an image.

 Organization 
The neurons are typically organized into multiple layers, especially in deep learning. Neurons of one layer connect only to neurons of the immediately preceding and immediately following layers. The layer that receives external data is the input layer. The layer that produces the ultimate result is the output layer. In between them are zero or more hidden layers. Single layer and unlayered networks are also used. Between two layers, multiple connection patterns are possible. They can be 'fully connected', with every neuron in one layer connecting to every neuron in the next layer. They can be pooling, where a group of neurons in one layer connect to a single neuron in the next layer, thereby reducing the number of neurons in that layer. Neurons with only such connections form a directed acyclic graph and are known as feedforward networks. Alternatively, networks that allow connections between neurons in the same or previous layers are known as recurrent networks. Hyperparameter 

A hyperparameter is a constant parameter whose value is set before the learning process begins. The values of parameters are derived via learning. Examples of hyperparameters include learning rate, the number of hidden layers and batch size. The values of some hyperparameters can be dependent on those of other hyperparameters. For example, the size of some layers can depend on the overall number of layers.

Learning

Learning is the adaptation of the network to better handle a task by considering sample observations. Learning involves adjusting the weights (and optional thresholds) of the network to improve the accuracy of the result. This is done by minimizing the observed errors. Learning is complete when examining additional observations does not usefully reduce the error rate. Even after learning, the error rate typically does not reach 0. If after learning, the error rate is too high, the network typically must be redesigned. Practically this is done by defining a cost function that is evaluated periodically during learning. As long as its output continues to decline, learning continues. The cost is frequently defined as a statistic whose value can only be approximated. The outputs are actually numbers, so when the error is low, the difference between the output (almost certainly a cat) and the correct answer (cat) is small. Learning attempts to reduce the total of the differences across the observations. Most learning models can be viewed as a straightforward application of optimization theory and statistical estimation.

 Learning rate 
The learning rate defines the size of the corrective steps that the model takes to adjust for errors in each observation. A high learning rate shortens the training time, but with lower ultimate accuracy, while a lower learning rate takes longer, but with the potential for greater accuracy. Optimizations such as Quickprop are primarily aimed at speeding up error minimization, while other improvements mainly try to increase reliability. In order to avoid oscillation inside the network such as alternating connection weights, and to improve the rate of convergence, refinements use an adaptive learning rate that increases or decreases as appropriate. The concept of momentum allows the balance between the gradient and the previous change to be weighted such that the weight adjustment depends to some degree on the previous change. A momentum close to 0 emphasizes the gradient, while a value close to 1 emphasizes the last change.

Cost function
While it is possible to define a cost function ad hoc, frequently the choice is determined by the function's desirable properties (such as convexity) or because it arises from the model (e.g. in a probabilistic model the model's posterior probability can be used as an inverse cost).

Backpropagation

Backpropagation is a method used to adjust the connection weights to compensate for each error found during learning. The error amount is effectively divided among the connections. Technically, backprop calculates the gradient (the derivative) of the cost function associated with a given state with respect to the weights. The weight updates can be done via stochastic gradient descent or other methods, such as Extreme Learning Machines, "No-prop" networks, training without backtracking, "weightless" networks,ESANN. 2009. and non-connectionist neural networks.

Learning paradigms

Machine learning is commonly separated into three main learning paradigms, supervised learning, unsupervised learning and reinforcement learning. Each corresponds to a particular learning task.

 Supervised learning 
Supervised learning uses a set of paired inputs and desired outputs. The learning task is to produce the desired output for each input. In this case, the cost function is related to eliminating incorrect deductions. A commonly used cost is the mean-squared error, which tries to minimize the average squared error between the network's output and the desired output. Tasks suited for supervised learning are pattern recognition (also known as classification) and regression (also known as function approximation). Supervised learning is also applicable to sequential data (e.g., for hand writing, speech and gesture recognition). This can be thought of as learning with a "teacher", in the form of a function that provides continuous feedback on the quality of solutions obtained thus far.

Unsupervised learning
In unsupervised learning, input data is given along with the cost function, some function of the data  and the network's output. The cost function is dependent on the task (the model domain) and any a priori assumptions (the implicit properties of the model, its parameters and the observed variables). As a trivial example, consider the model  where  is a constant and the cost . Minimizing this cost produces a value of  that is equal to the mean of the data. The cost function can be much more complicated. Tasks that fall within the paradigm of unsupervised learning are in general estimation problems; the applications include clustering, the estimation of statistical distributions, compression and filtering.

Reinforcement learning

In applications such as playing video games, an actor takes a string of actions, receiving a generally unpredictable response from the environment after each one. The goal is to win the game, i.e., generate the most positive (lowest cost) responses. In reinforcement learning, the aim is to weight the network (devise a policy) to perform actions that minimize long-term (expected cumulative) cost. At each point in time the agent performs an action and the environment generates an observation and an instantaneous cost, according to some (usually unknown) rules. The rules and the long-term cost usually only can be estimated. At any juncture, the agent decides whether to explore new actions to uncover their costs or to exploit prior learning to proceed more quickly.

Formally the environment is modeled as a Markov decision process (MDP) with states  and actions . Because the state transitions are not known, probability distributions are used instead: the instantaneous cost distribution , the observation distribution  and the transition distribution , while a policy is defined as the conditional distribution over actions given the observations. Taken together, the two define a Markov chain (MC). The aim is to discover the lowest-cost MC.

ANNs serve as the learning component in such applications. Dynamic programming coupled with ANNs (giving neurodynamic programming) has been applied to problems such as those involved in vehicle routing, video games, natural resource management and medicine because of ANNs ability to mitigate losses of accuracy even when reducing the discretization grid density for numerically approximating the solution of control problems. Tasks that fall within the paradigm of reinforcement learning are control problems, games and other sequential decision making tasks.

Self-learning

Self-learning in neural networks was introduced in 1982 along with a neural network capable of self-learning named Crossbar Adaptive Array (CAA). It is a system with only one input, situation s, and only one output, action (or behavior) a. It has neither external advice input nor external reinforcement input from the environment. The CAA computes, in a crossbar fashion, both decisions about actions and emotions (feelings) about encountered situations. The system is driven by the interaction between cognition and emotion. Given the memory matrix, W =||w(a,s)||, the crossbar self-learning algorithm in each iteration performs the following computation:
   In situation s perform action a;
   Receive consequence situation s';
   Compute emotion of being in consequence situation v(s');
   Update crossbar memory w'(a,s) = w(a,s) + v(s').

The backpropagated value (secondary reinforcement) is the emotion toward the consequence situation. The CAA exists in two environments, one is behavioral environment where it behaves, and the other is genetic environment, where from it initially and only once receives initial emotions about to be encountered situations in the behavioral environment. Having received the genome vector (species vector) from the genetic environment, the CAA will learn a goal-seeking behavior, in the behavioral environment that contains both desirable and undesirable situations.

 Neuroevolution 

Neuroevolution can create neural network topologies and weights using evolutionary computation. It is competitive with sophisticated gradient descent approaches. One advantage of neuroevolution is that it may be less prone to get caught in "dead ends".

Stochastic neural network

Stochastic neural networks originating from  Sherrington–Kirkpatrick models  are a type of artificial neural network built by introducing random variations into the network, either by giving the network's artificial neurons stochastic transfer functions, or by giving them stochastic weights. This makes them useful tools for optimization problems, since the random fluctuations help the network escape from local minima. Stochastic neural networks trained using a Bayesian approach are known as Bayesian neural networks.

Other
In a Bayesian framework, a distribution over the set of allowed models is chosen to minimize the cost. Evolutionary methods, gene expression programming, simulated annealing, expectation-maximization, non-parametric methods and particle swarm optimization are other learning algorithms. Convergent recursion is a learning algorithm for cerebellar model articulation controller (CMAC) neural networks.

 Modes 

Two modes of learning are available: stochastic and batch. In stochastic learning, each input creates a weight adjustment. In batch learning weights are adjusted based on a batch of inputs, accumulating errors over the batch. Stochastic learning introduces "noise" into the process, using the local gradient calculated from one data point; this reduces the chance of the network getting stuck in local minima. However, batch learning typically yields a faster, more stable descent to a local minimum, since each update is performed in the direction of the batch's average error. A common compromise is to use "mini-batches", small batches with samples in each batch selected stochastically from the entire data set.

 Types 

ANNs have evolved into a broad family of techniques that have advanced the state of the art across multiple domains.  The simplest types have one or more static components, including number of units, number of layers, unit weights and topology. Dynamic types allow one or more of these to evolve via learning. The latter are much more complicated, but can shorten learning periods and produce better results. Some types allow/require learning to be "supervised" by the operator, while others operate independently. Some types operate purely in hardware, while others are purely software and run on general purpose computers.

Some of the main breakthroughs include: convolutional neural networks that have proven particularly successful in processing visual and other two-dimensional data;Yann LeCun (2016).

 Network design 

Neural architecture search (NAS) uses machine learning to automate ANN design. Various approaches to NAS have designed networks that compare well with hand-designed systems. The basic search algorithm is to propose a candidate model, evaluate it against a dataset and use the results as feedback to teach the NAS network. Available systems include AutoML and AutoKeras.

Design issues include deciding the number, type and connectedness of network layers, as well as the size of each and the connection type (full, pooling, ...).

Hyperparameters must also be defined as part of the design (they are not learned), governing matters such as how many neurons are in each layer, learning rate, step, stride, depth, receptive field and padding (for CNNs), etc.

 Use 

Using Artificial neural networks requires an understanding of their characteristics.
 Choice of model: This depends on the data representation and the application. Overly complex models are slow learning.
 Learning algorithm: Numerous trade-offs exist between learning algorithms. Almost any algorithm will work well with the correct hyperparameters for training on a particular data set. However, selecting and tuning an algorithm for training on unseen data requires significant experimentation.
 Robustness: If the model, cost function and learning algorithm are selected appropriately, the resulting ANN can become robust.
ANN capabilities fall within the following broad categories:

 Function approximation, or regression analysis, including time series prediction, fitness approximation and modeling.
 Classification, including pattern and sequence recognition, novelty detection and sequential decision making.
 Data processing, including filtering, clustering, blind source separation and compression.
 Robotics, including directing manipulators and prostheses.

Applications
Because of their ability to reproduce and model nonlinear processes, artificial neural networks have found applications in many disciplines. Application areas include system identification and control (vehicle control, trajectory prediction, process control, natural resource management), quantum chemistry, general game playing, pattern recognition (radar systems, face identification, signal classification, 3D reconstruction, object recognition and more), sensor data analysis, sequence recognition (gesture, speech, handwritten and printed text recognition), medical diagnosis, finance (e.g. ex-ante models for specific financial long-run forecasts and artificial financial markets), data mining, visualization, machine translation, social network filtering and e-mail spam filtering. ANNs have been used to diagnose several types of cancers and to distinguish highly invasive cancer cell lines from less invasive lines using only cell shape information.

ANNs have been used to accelerate reliability analysis of infrastructures subject to natural disasters and to predict foundation settlements. ANNs have also been used for building black-box models in geoscience: hydrology, ocean modelling and coastal engineering, and geomorphology. ANNs have been employed in cybersecurity, with the objective to discriminate between legitimate activities and malicious ones. For example, machine learning has been used for classifying Android malware, for identifying domains belonging to threat actors and for detecting URLs posing a security risk. Research is underway on ANN systems designed for penetration testing, for detecting botnets, credit cards frauds and network intrusions.

ANNs have been proposed as a tool to solve partial differential equations in physics and simulate the properties of many-body open quantum systems. In brain research ANNs have studied short-term behavior of individual neurons, the dynamics of neural circuitry arise from interactions between individual neurons and how behavior can arise from abstract neural modules that represent complete subsystems. Studies considered long-and short-term plasticity of neural systems and their relation to learning and memory from the individual neuron to the system level.

Theoretical properties
Computational power

The multilayer perceptron is a universal function approximator, as proven by the universal approximation theorem. However, the proof is not constructive regarding the number of neurons required, the network topology, the weights and the learning parameters.

A specific recurrent architecture with rational-valued weights (as opposed to full precision real number-valued weights) has the power of a universal Turing machine, using a finite number of neurons and standard linear connections. Further, the use of irrational values for weights results in a machine with super-Turing power.

Capacity
A model's "capacity" property corresponds to its ability to model any given function. It is related to the amount of information that can be stored in the network and to the notion of complexity.
Two notions of capacity are known by the community. The information capacity and the VC Dimension. The information capacity of a perceptron is intensively discussed in Sir David MacKay's book which summarizes work by Thomas Cover. The capacity of a network of standard neurons (not convolutional) can be derived by four rules that derive from understanding a neuron as an electrical element. The information capacity captures the functions modelable by the network given any data as input. The second notion, is the VC dimension. VC Dimension uses the principles of measure theory and finds the maximum capacity under the best possible circumstances. This is, given input data in a specific form.  As noted in, the VC Dimension for arbitrary inputs is half the information capacity of a Perceptron. The VC Dimension for arbitrary points is sometimes referred to as Memory Capacity.

Convergence
Models may not consistently converge on a single solution, firstly because local minima may exist, depending on the cost function and the model. Secondly, the optimization method used might not guarantee to converge when it begins far from any local minimum. Thirdly, for sufficiently large data or parameters, some methods become impractical.

Another issue worthy to mention is that training may cross some Saddle point which may lead the convergence to the wrong direction.

The convergence behavior of certain types of ANN architectures are more understood than others. When the width of network approaches to infinity, the ANN is well described by its first order Taylor expansion throughout training, and so inherits the convergence behavior of affine models. Another example is when parameters are small, it is observed that ANNs often fits target functions from low to high frequencies. This behavior is referred to as the spectral bias, or frequency principle, of neural networks. This phenomenon is the opposite to the behavior of some well studied iterative numerical schemes such as Jacobi method. Deeper neural networks have been observed to be more biased towards low frequency functions.

Generalization and statistics

Applications whose goal is to create a system that generalizes well to unseen examples, face the possibility of over-training. This arises in convoluted or over-specified systems when the network capacity significantly exceeds the needed free parameters. Two approaches address over-training. The first is to use cross-validation and similar techniques to check for the presence of over-training and to select hyperparameters to minimize the generalization error.

The second is to use some form of regularization''. This concept emerges in a probabilistic (Bayesian) framework, where regularization can be performed by selecting a larger prior probability over simpler models; but also in statistical learning theory, where the goal is to minimize over two quantities: the 'empirical risk' and the 'structural risk', which roughly corresponds to the error over the training set and the predicted error in unseen data due to overfitting.

Supervised neural networks that use a mean squared error (MSE) cost function can use formal statistical methods to determine the confidence of the trained model. The MSE on a validation set can be used as an estimate for variance. This value can then be used to calculate the confidence interval of network output, assuming a normal distribution. A confidence analysis made this way is statistically valid as long as the output probability distribution stays the same and the network is not modified.

By assigning a softmax activation function, a generalization of the logistic function, on the output layer of the neural network (or a softmax component in a component-based network) for categorical target variables, the outputs can be interpreted as posterior probabilities. This is useful in classification as it gives a certainty measure on classifications.

The softmax activation function is:

Criticism

Training 
A common criticism of neural networks, particularly in robotics, is that they require too much training for real-world operation. Potential solutions include randomly shuffling training examples, by using a numerical optimization algorithm that does not take too large steps when changing the network connections following an example, grouping examples in so-called mini-batches and/or introducing a recursive least squares algorithm for CMAC.

Theory

A central claim of ANNs is that they embody new and powerful general principles for processing information. These principles are ill-defined. It is often claimed that they are emergent from the network itself. This allows simple statistical association (the basic function of artificial neural networks) to be described as learning or recognition. In 1997, Alexander Dewdney commented that, as a result, artificial neural networks have a "something-for-nothing quality, one that imparts a peculiar aura of laziness and a distinct lack of curiosity about just how good these computing systems are. No human hand (or mind) intervenes; solutions are found as if by magic; and no one, it seems, has learned anything". One response to Dewdney is that neural networks handle many complex and diverse tasks, ranging from autonomously flying aircraft to detecting credit card fraud to mastering the game of Go.

Technology writer Roger Bridgman commented:

Biological brains use both shallow and deep circuits as reported by brain anatomy, displaying a wide variety of invariance. Weng argued that the brain self-wires largely according to signal statistics and therefore, a serial cascade cannot catch all major statistical dependencies.

Hardware
Large and effective neural networks require considerable computing resources. While the brain has hardware tailored to the task of processing signals through a graph of neurons, simulating even a simplified neuron on von Neumann architecture may consume vast amounts of memory and storage. Furthermore, the designer often needs to transmit signals through many of these connections and their associated neurons which require enormous CPU power and time.

Schmidhuber noted that the resurgence of neural networks in the twenty-first century is largely attributable to advances in hardware: from 1991 to 2015, computing power, especially as delivered by GPGPUs (on GPUs), has increased around a million-fold, making the standard backpropagation algorithm feasible for training networks that are several layers deeper than before. The use of accelerators such as FPGAs and GPUs can reduce training times from months to days.

Neuromorphic engineering or a physical neural network addresses the hardware difficulty directly, by constructing non-von-Neumann chips to directly implement neural networks in circuitry. Another type of chip optimized for neural network processing is called a Tensor Processing Unit, or TPU.

Practical counterexamples 
Analyzing what has been learned by an ANN is much easier than analyzing what has been learned by a biological neural network. Furthermore, researchers involved in exploring learning algorithms for neural networks are gradually uncovering general principles that allow a learning machine to be successful. For example, local vs. non-local learning and shallow vs. deep architecture.

Hybrid approaches
Advocates of hybrid models (combining neural networks and symbolic approaches) say that such a mixture can better capture the mechanisms of the human mind.

Gallery

See also 

 ADALINE
 Autoencoder
 Bio-inspired computing
 Blue Brain Project
 Catastrophic interference
 Cognitive architecture
 Connectionist expert system
 Connectomics
 Large width limits of neural networks
 List of machine learning concepts
 Neural gas
 Neural network software
 Optical neural network
 Parallel distributed processing
 Philosophy of artificial intelligence
 Recurrent neural networks
 Spiking neural network 
 Tensor product network

Notes

References

Bibliography

 
 
 
  PDF
 
 
 
 
created for National Science Foundation, Contract Number EET-8716324, and Defense Advanced Research Projects Agency (DOD), ARPA Order No. 4976 under Contract F33615-87-C-1499. 
 
 
 
 
 
 
 
 
 
 
  
 
 
 

Computational statistics
 
Classification algorithms
Computational neuroscience
Market research
Mathematical psychology
Mathematical and quantitative methods (economics)